Elena Guerra (23 June 1835 – 11 April 1914) was an Italian Roman Catholic religious sister and the founder of the Oblates of the Holy Spirit. Guerra was a strong proponent on the Holy Spirit as a motivation to do pious works. She was known to have been dedicated her life to the education of particularly Chinese and African girls.

Life
Elena Guerra was born into a wealthy, aristocratic family in Lucca on 23 June 1835 as one of six children to Antonio Guerra and Faustina Franceschi. In her childhood she was known to be talented but timid in nature. Guerra made her Confirmation on 5 June 1843.

Guerra first worked with the Vincentians, caring for the poor and the sick. Cholera struck Lucca in 1853 and she tended to the ill after her parents granted her permission to do so. Guerra studied French as well as music and art but also learnt Latin and the lives and works of the Church Fathers during an illness that spanned from 1857 to 1864 as she could not leave the house because of it. In 1866 she established a lay association dedicated to the education of girls under the patronage of Our Lady, St. Joseph and the patroness of Lucca, St. Zita One of her students was Gemma Galgani.

Guerra travelled to Rome in 1870 to attend a session of the First Vatican Council that Pope Pius IX had convened. Guerra and her father made an Easter pilgrimage there in April 1870 and visited the tomb of Saint Peter before she was able to meet with the pope on 23 June 1870. In 1885 she wrote Pope Leo XIII and asked him to rekindle in the faithful devotion to the Holy Spirit. Leo XIII responded with an apostolic letter (Provida matris caritate). Encouraged, Guerra wrote thirteen letters to Leo between 1895 and 1903. Leo issued the encyclical Divinum illud munus (subtitled "On the Holy Spirit") in 1897, in which he established the novena to the Holy Spirit to be prayed between the Feast of the Ascension and Pentecost. He followed this in 1902, with a letter to the bishops, Ad fovendum in Christiano populo.

Leo XIII granted her a private audience on 18 October 1897 in which he encouraged her work and renamed the community. It was at some stage that she corresponded with Arnold Janssen regarding a "militia of the Holy Spirit" that would be dedicated to working against the Freemasons. In August 1906 the Archbishop of Lucca told her that he would not permit her prospective religious to make their vows unless Guerra resigned as the congregation's leadership. Guerra resigned her position after reflection more so in light of internal friction with some sisters questioning the manner in which she was leading the congregation. It finally received papal approval from Pope Pius X on 6 March 1911.

Pope Pius X issued a pontifical decree of coronation in 9 September 1904 granted to Elena Guerra to impose a diadem of stars towards their venerated image of the Blessed Virgin of the Immaculate Conception for the 50th Anniversary of the Marian Jubilee of 1904 enshrined within their monastery.

Guerra died on 11 April 1914 (on Holy Saturday). Her relics are kept in the church of Sant'Agostino in Lucca. The congregation continues its work with houses in nations such as Iran and the Philippines amongst others; in 2008 there were 232 members of the congregation in 36 houses across the globe. 

John Bosco referred to Guerra as a "golden pen" in reference to her spiritual writings. When Pope John XXIII beatified her in 1959, he called her a "modern day apostle of the Holy Spirit".

Beatification

The beatification process commenced in Lucca on 5 May 1936. Two local processes were held on a diocesan level and were both ratified on 13 April 1945 after documents were sent to the Congregation for Rites; her spiritual writings received theological approval on 21 May 1935. An antepreparatory committee approved the documents pertaining to the cause on 26 June 1951 as did a preparatory one on 20 January 1953 and a general committee on 21 April 1953. Pope Pius XII approved her life of heroic virtue and proclaimed her to be Venerable on 26 June 1953.

Two investigations into two alleged miracles were held and were both validated and ratified on 16 October 1953. The miracle was soon approved (after passing several boards) and allowed for Pope John XXIII to celebrate her beatification on 26 April 1959 in Saint Peter's Basilica. 5000 of her own congregation attended the beatification celebration. The apostolic letter Renovanis faciem terrae' was the document that authorized the beatification, signed by Cardinal Secretary of State Cardinal Domenico Tardini.

The current postulator overseeing this cause is the Cistercian Ugo Gianluigi Tagni.

References

External links
 Saints SQPN
 Renovans Faciem - apostolic letter confirming beatification

1835 births
1914 deaths
19th-century Italian Roman Catholic religious sisters and nuns
19th-century venerated Christians
20th-century Italian Roman Catholic religious sisters and nuns
20th-century venerated Christians
Beatifications by Pope John XXIII
Founders of Catholic religious communities
Italian beatified people
Italian educators
Italian venerated Catholics
Religious leaders from Lucca